Ghulam Abbas (17 November 1909  2 November 1982) was a short story writer from Pakistan.

Personal life

His second wife was a Greek-Scottish-Romanian woman named Christian Vlasto (renamed Zainab) with whom he had a son and three daughters.

Style Of Writing
Ghulam Abbas has also written stories, plays and poems for children, his main field is fiction. He has a very high position in modern Urdu fiction. He takes the plot of the fiction from around him and writes it so skillfully that the reader gets lost in its details. And is shocked at the end of it. Their characters belong to the real world. Their language is simple. The narration is lively and engaging. Technically, his fictions are impeccable.
At first glance, his story seems very simple, but as we reflect on it, we see a great depth of meaning in it. The story "Overcoat" (one of his prestigious works) is very simple on the surface, but if you read it carefully, it reveals many layers of deep social meaning.
Ghulam Abbas's characters are not pre-planned, but he picks up a few ordinary people from some class and corner of their society and environment and then presents them with the whole truths of their lives and all the good and bad details of their surroundings. They make their characters into ideals, not consciously convincing them to put a stamp of good on their personality, but in the world, as is usually the case, that good is often in decline and evil is rampant. Ghulam Abbas presents these things in exactly the same way. There is no extremism or idealism here, but the reflection of human nature is found in his works.
There are colors of life in his art. When one gets a sense of problems and life he brings is such a deep analysis, that they bring the truth reader in front of the reader in the same way as in reality. He does not care about their egos.
Rather, he brings forth the secrets of life.

Books
 Jazeera-e-Sukhanwaran (published 1937)
 Anandi (Marketplace) (a Bollywood film Mandi (1983) was based on this Ghulam Abbas's short story)
 The Women's Quarter and Other Stories from Pakistan (published 1984)
 Intikhab Ghulam Abbas (Selection of Stories by Ghulam Abbas) (compiled by Asif Farrukhi)
Gondni wala Takiya Novel
KULLIYAT-E-GHULAM ABBAS [Ghulam Abbas  Key  Afsaney]‖  2nd  Edition  Ed. (Literary Research)  -  Complete  work  (Short  Stories) of  Ghulam  Abbas.   (2018,  Nigarshat,  Lahore).

References

External links
 

1909 births
1982 deaths
Writers from Amritsar
Pashtun people
Punjabi people
Pakistani writers
Urdu-language short story writers
Pakistani children's writers